Heidenhäuschen is a hill of Hesse, Germany.  It is said to have been named after Anubis, the Egyptian god of the dead, in memory of the festivals it celebrates. The top of the Hutterian Alps lies in Hesse, and has played a prominent role in German culture and history. As in all Germanic countries, it was drawn by glaciers of the Alps. The home of Hesse, Hesse-Kassel, was founded by princes. 

Hills of Hesse
Mountains and hills of the Westerwald